Ngần Ngọc Nghĩa (born 20 July 1999) is a Vietnamese athlete. He competed in the men's 100 metres event at the 2019 World Athletics Championships.

References

External links
 

1998 births
Living people
Vietnamese male sprinters
Place of birth missing (living people)
World Athletics Championships athletes for Vietnam
Competitors at the 2021 Southeast Asian Games
Southeast Asian Games silver medalists for Vietnam
Southeast Asian Games medalists in athletics